Firas Chaouat (born 8 May 1996) is a Tunisian professional footballer who plays as a forward for Ismaily SC and the Tunisia national football team.

Career
In September 2022, Chaouat joined Egyptian Premier League club Ismaily SC.

Career statistics

International

References

External links

1996 births
Living people
People from Sfax
Association football forwards
Tunisian footballers
Tunisian expatriate footballers
Tunisia international footballers
Tunisian Ligue Professionnelle 1 players
Saudi Professional League players
CS Sfaxien players
Olympique Béja players
Abha Club players
2019 Africa Cup of Nations players
Expatriate footballers in Saudi Arabia
Tunisian expatriate sportspeople in Saudi Arabia
Tunisian expatriate sportspeople in Egypt
Ismaily SC players
Egyptian Premier League players